The Philippine Association of the Record Industry (Filipino: Kapisanan ng Industriya ng Plaka ng Pilipinas, abbreviated as PARI) is a non-profit and private trade organization, that represents the recording industry distributors in the Philippines.

The PARI was formed on February 10, 1972, and today is composed of 14 corporate members and 13 associate members. Since then, the association had worked with the Congress on drafting music copyright laws and had helped conduct raids on music pirates with the National Bureau of Investigation, Philippine National Police, Criminal Investigation and Detection Group and Optical Media Board.

It is also responsible for awarding music recording certifications in the Philippines. Annually, PARI organizes different music events such as the Awit Awards.

History
In the early 1950s, music piracy started to grow in the Philippines. So, in 1952, major recording companies organized the first recording industry association in the country called the Record Industry Association of the Philippines (RIAP). The association was mostly composed of foreign licensees. The first president of RIAP was Manuel P. Villar of Mareco. In 1971, independent record companies decided to bond together and formed the Philippine Recording Industry Association (PRIA). Its primary goal was to promote local records. PRIA elected their first president which was Jose Mari Gonzales of Cinema-Audio. In their years of existence, the two organizations had cooperated with each other in fighting piracy.

On February 10, 1972, another organization in the record industry was created called the Philippine Association of the Record Industry (PARI). Antonio Lustre of the Home Industries Development Corporation (HIDCOR) was elected as its first president. After the first two organizations were disbanded, PARI became the only and legitimate association of the record companies in the Philippines, combining both major and independent record companies.

In 1990, the association began certifying recorded music in the Philippines. Constant Change by Jose Mari Chan was the first ever album to be certified. It was certified diamond on November 10, 1990. Since the awards program was launched, only eight albums were certified diamond by PARI. Aside from Constant Change, the other seven are:
 Christmas in Our Hearts by Jose Mari Chan
 Nina Live! by Nina
 A Wonderful Christmas by Christian Bautista
 Araw Oras Tagpuan by Sponge Cola
 Doo-Wops & Hooligans by Bruno Mars

Other than certifying albums, the organization also certifies singles and music videos. On January 16, 2013, the first ever single was certified. It was "I'll Be There" by Julie Anne San Jose and it was certified quadruple platinum during that time. On the other hand, no music videos are certified yet.

The Philippine Association of the Record Industry filed a complaint against the popular torrent website KickassTorrents, resulting in its seizure by Philippine authorities on June 13, 2013.

Certification levels
Before 1990, music certifications were only awarded by record labels in their artists through their own guidelines until PARI took the work.

Album certifications include both physical and digital sales. Beginning in March 2012, PARI began to certify singles (both digital and physical) and music videos. Before 2012, the thresholds for albums were distinguished between the domestic and international repertoire. Currently, domestic repertoire shares the same thresholds along with the international repertoire. For the full list of music certifications, please go to their database.

Albums

Singles

Music videos

Members
The members of Philippine Association of the Record Industry are divided into two: corporate and associate. The corporate members are the major record companies while the associate members are the small, independent record companies.

Corporate
 Alpha Music 
 Dyna Music
 GMA Music (formerly known as Infiniti Music)
 Ivory Music and Video (distributor of Sony Music catalog in the Philippines from mid-2011 to early 2018)
 PolyEast Records (formerly known as Canary Records, OctoArts International, OctoArts EMI Music and EMI Philippines) 
 Galaxy Records
 Praise Music
 Sony Music Philippines (formerly known as BMG Records Pilipinas and Sony BMG Philippines, re-opened in 2018) 
 Star Music
 UMUSIC Philippines (formerly known as PolyCosmic Records and MCA Music)
 Universal Records (formerly known as WEA Records)
 Viva Records
 Vicor Music
 Warner Music Philippines

Associate
 Aika Records Music Production
 Amtrust Leisure Corporation 
 Bellhaus Entertainment 
 Business and Arts 
 Careless
 Curve Entertainment
 Ditto Music Philippines
 HOMEWORKZ Entertainment Services
 Jesuit Communications Foundation 
 Musikatha Ministries Foundation
 O/C Records
 Off the Record
 Pineapple Riddims Recording Company
 Shepherd's Voice Publications 
 Signature Music
 Vertical Brew Music

See also

List of best-selling albums in the Philippines

References

External links
  
 

IFPI members
Music industry associations
Music organizations based in the Philippines
Organizations established in 1972
1972 establishments in the Philippines